Shilongo is a name of Namibian origin that may refer to:
Shilongo Uukule (1919–2010), senior headman of the Uukwanambwa, a clan of the Ovambo people in Namibia 
Julius Shaambeni Shilongo Mnyika (1938–2003), Namibian guerrilla with the South West African Liberation Army (SWALA)
Benson Shilongo (born 1992), Namibian footballer

Namibian surnames
Namibian given names